If I Had a Million is a 1932 American pre-Code Paramount Studios anthology film starring Gary Cooper, George Raft, Charles Laughton, W.C. Fields, Jack Oakie, Frances Dee and Charlie Ruggles, among others. There were seven directors: Ernst Lubitsch, Norman Taurog, Stephen Roberts, Norman Z. McLeod, James Cruze, William A. Seiter, and H. Bruce Humberstone. Lubitsch, Cruze, Seiter, and Humberstone were each responsible for a single vignette, Roberts and McLeod directed two each, and Taurog was in charge of the prologue and epilogue. The screenplays were scripted by many different writers, with Joseph L. Mankiewicz making a large contribution. If I Had a Million is based on a novel by Robert Hardy Andrews.

A wealthy dying businessman played by veteran actor Richard Bennett decides to leave his money to eight complete strangers. Gary Cooper, Charles Laughton, George Raft, May Robson, Charles Ruggles, and Gene Raymond play some of the lucky beneficiaries.

The 1950s television series The Millionaire was based on a similar concept.

Plot
Dying industrial tycoon John Glidden cannot decide what to do with his wealth. He despises his money-hungry relatives and believes none of his employees is capable of running his various companies. Finally, he decides to give a million dollars each to eight people picked at random from a telephone directory before he passes away, so as to avoid his will being contested. (The first name selected is John D. Rockefeller, which is swiftly rejected.)

China Shop
 Directed by Norman Z. McLeod

Henry Peabody is unhappy, both at work and at home. A bookkeeper promoted to salesman in a china shop, Henry keeps breaking the merchandise, meaning his "raise" results in his bringing home less money than before, something his nagging wife is quick to notice. After Glidden gives him a certified check, Henry shows up late for work and then proceeds to gleefully wreak destruction on the wares.

Violet
 Directed by Stephen Roberts

Barroom prostitute Violet Smith checks into the most expensive hotel suite she can find and goes to sleep ... alone.

The Forger
 Directed by H. Bruce Humberstone

Eddie Jackson narrowly avoids arrest for trying to cash a forged check. With his prior record, if he were caught, it would mean a life sentence in prison. When Glidden presents him with his check, Eddie is delighted ... at first. However, he does not dare show his face in a bank, and none of his criminal associates believes the check is genuine. Frantic to leave town and desperately needing to sleep, the penniless man gives the check as security for a 10 cent bed in a flophouse. The manager secretly calls the police to take away what he thinks is a lunatic, and uses the check to light his cigar.

Road Hogs
 Directed by Norman Z. McLeod

Ex-vaudeville performer Emily La Rue is very content with her life, running her tea room with the help of her partner, ex-juggler Rollo. Only one thing is lacking to make her satisfaction complete, and it is delivered that very day: a brand new car. However, when they take it out for a drive, it is wrecked when another driver ignores a stop signal. The heartbroken woman returns to her tea room, where Glidden finds her.

She comes up with an inventive way to spend part of her great windfall. She and Rollo purchase eight used cars and hire drivers. They all take to the road in a long procession. When they encounter an inconsiderate road hog, Emily and Rollo immediately set off in pursuit and crash into the offender's automobile. They then switch to one of their spare cars and repeat the process, until they run out of automobiles. At the end of the day, Emily purchases another new car, but it too is destroyed in a collision with a truck. No matter. Emily tells Rollo it has been "a glorious day".

This sequence was one of four written by Joe Mankiewicz, and contains a reference to his hometown Wilkes-Barre, Pennsylvania.

Death Cell
 Directed by James Cruze

Prisoner John Wallace has been condemned to the electric chair for killing someone during a robbery. After a tearful conversation with his wife Mary, he is visited in his cell by Glidden. John is certain that his new-found wealth will save him, but it is too late. He is executed that same day, despite his protests.

The Clerk
 Directed by Ernst Lubitsch

When clerk Phineas V. Lambert receives his check in the mail, he shows little emotion. He merely leaves his desk, calmly climbs the stairs to the office of first the secretary of the president of the company, then to the office of the private secretary, and finally knocks on the door of the president himself. When he is admitted, Phineas blows a raspberry at his former boss and leaves.

The Three Marines
 Directed by William A. Seiter

Glidden finds U.S. Marine Steve Gallagher and his good buddies Mulligan and O'Brien in the stockade for striking their sergeant. However, when Glidden gives Gallagher the check, Gallagher notices it is April Fools' Day and assumes it is a joke.

When the three men are released, they immediately head for a nearby lunch stand to see Marie, the pretty waitress. They all want to take her to the carnival, but none of them has any money. Then Gallagher remembers his check and that Zeb, the stand's owner, is illiterate. He tells Zeb that the check is for $10 and gets Zeb to cash it. He and Marie head off to the carnival, but Gallagher cannot shake his pals. Then Mulligan becomes embroiled in a fight, his comrades join in, and the trio end up right back in the stockade. Through the bars, they watch dumbfounded as a fancily dressed Zeb steps out of a limousine, escorting an equally well-garbed Marie.

Grandma
 Directed by Stephen Roberts

The last beneficiary is Mary Walker, one of many unhappy elderly women consigned to a rest home run by Mrs. Garvey (an uncredited Blanche Friderici). Mrs. Garvey is a petty tyrant who enforces her rules rigorously, to the displeasure of her charges, especially the spirited, defiant Mary. Mary uses her money to turn the tables. She pays Mrs. Garvey and the rest of the staff just to sit in rocking chairs while she and the other residents have a wonderful time partying and dancing with their gentleman friends.

Mary's spirit even reinvigorates John Glidden. Glidden ignores his doctor and looks forward to spending time with Mary.

Cast (in credits order)
Gary Cooper as Steve Gallagher
Charles Laughton as Phineas V. Lambert
George Raft as Eddie Jackson
Jack Oakie as Private Mulligan
Richard Bennett as John Glidden
Charles Ruggles as Henry Peabody
Alison Skipworth as Emily La Rue
W. C. Fields as Rollo La Rue
Mary Boland as Mrs Peabody
Roscoe Karns as Private O'Brien
May Robson as Mrs Mary Walker
Wynne Gibson as Violet Smith
Gene Raymond as John Wallace
Frances Dee as Mary Wallace
Lucien Littlefield as Zeb - Hamburger Stand Owner
Joyce Compton as Marie - Waitress
Cecil Cunningham as friend of Emily La Rue
Mai Wells as Idylwood Resident (uncredited)

Reception
The New York Times review called it "an unusually good entertainment worked out with true imagination and originality, except possibly for one interlude (Death Cell)."

Notes

References

External links

1932 films
1932 comedy films
American comedy films
American anthology films
American black-and-white films
Films directed by Ernst Lubitsch
Films directed by James Cruze
Films directed by Norman Taurog
Films directed by Norman Z. McLeod
Films directed by Stephen Roberts
Films directed by William A. Seiter
Films based on American novels
Paramount Pictures films
Films with screenplays by Sidney Buchman
Films set in 1932
1930s English-language films
1930s American films